The 2016 Vuelta a España began on 21 August, with Stage 21 scheduled for 11 September. The 2016 edition of the cycle race began with the only team time trial stage of the race, just outside Ourense.

Classification standings

Stage 12
1 September 2016 — Los Corrales de Buelna – Bilbao,

Stage 13
2 September 2016 — Bilbao – Urdax-Dantxarinea,

Stage 14
3 September 2016 — Urdax-Dantxarinea – Col d'Aubisque (Gourette),

Stage 15
4 September 2016 — Sabiñánigo – Aramon Formigal, Sallent de Gállego

Stage 16
5 September 2016 — Alcañiz – Peñiscola

Stage 17
7 September 2016 — Castellón – Lluenca, Mas de la Costa

Stage 18
8 September 2016 — Requena – Gandia

Stage 19
9 September 2016 — Xàbia – Calp , individual time trial (ITT)

Stage 20
10 September 2016 — Benidorm – Aito de Aitana

Stage 21
11 September 2016 — Las Rozas – Madrid

Notes

References

Stage 12
Vuelta a España stages